Cedar Lake is a lake in Martin County, in the U.S. state of Minnesota.

Cedar Lake was named for the red cedar trees near the lake.

See also
List of lakes in Minnesota

References

Lakes of Minnesota
Lakes of Martin County, Minnesota